Victoria Park, increasingly known by its Turrbal name of Barrambin, is a heritage-listed park located in Spring Hill and Herston in Brisbane, Australia. It was added to the Queensland Heritage Register on 3 December 2007. The site was formerly a public golf course that opened in November 1931, before it was converted back to a park in June 2021 as part of redevelopment works.

Prior to colonisation, Victoria Park was a traditional meeting place of local groups and the site of cultural gatherings with approximately 400 people residing on the land. A British settlement was formed on part of the land in the 1840s, named York's Hollow, which was initially co-existent with Aboriginal camps before it gradually grew and displaced the local Turrbal groups. Several killings of Aboriginal people and burning of camps occurred in the 1850s and 1860s, as well as individual killings of Aboriginal Elders.

Indigenous history 
Victoria Park is also known as Barrambin, which means "the windy place" in the traditional language of the Turrbal peoples. The area of Victoria Park closest to the site of the Royal Brisbane and Women's Hospital and the Mayne Railway Yard at Bowen Hills was likely known more specifically as "Walan". It was traditionally a meeting and gathering place for Indigenous groups travelling through the area, as well as a cultural site for corroboree, dance, hunting and fishing. Traditional spearing challenges between Indigenous families would also be held at the site, near the RNA showgrounds, which attracted white spectators after settlement of the surrounding areas.

At the time of British settlement, the number of Aboriginal Australians living at Barrambin was significantly more than the number of settlers. Dr Ray Kerkhove of the University of Queensland described the sharing of resources between Indigenous camps and the York's Hollow settlement on the site. During this period however, there were two significant attacks against Aboriginal groups by colonial police and the British Army, as well as several killings of Aboriginal leaders and Elders.

From the time of settlement through to as late as the 1910s, some settlers would allow Aboriginal people to camp on land despite the colonial government not designating any land in the Brisbane region for use by Aboriginal groups.

There were a large number of creeks that snaked through Barrambin, serving as de facto borders between Aboriginal families camping on the site. British settlement resulted in Aboriginal people being chased off land by police and having to cross these borders. Areas across from borders were recalled as places where communities could live and hunt without being attacked or molested by colonial forces. It has been proposed that due to Aboriginal traditions, new settlers that would cross these borders without seeking permission were often assaulted and robbed.

By the 1860s, most Aboriginal people had been either been removed from, or had left, Barrambin.

In 2009, Brisbane City Council and Turrbal Traditional Owners agreed to add the traditional name of Barrambin as a dual name for Victoria Park, and in 2020, the Council announced plans to build an Indigenous cultural learning centre on the land.

History 
Victoria Park covers an area of 64 hectares of undulating land in Brisbane city, in the suburb of Herston and Bowen Hills. Named for the reigning British monarch at the time, Queen Victoria, the park was gazetted in 1875.

Victoria Park provides recreational facilities such as cricket pitches, swimming pool and golf course (redesigned with a new clubhouse in 1974). It also provides much needed parking facilities during the annual Brisbane Exhibition (Ekka) held in the adjacent Brisbane Exhibition Ground. Victoria Park will be the Venue for Equestrian events at the 2032 Summer Olympics.

Settlement and colonisation in the mid-1800s
Herston was first colonised by Europeans in 1859, although the area was being utilised from as early as the 1820s for major industrial activities such as brick-making and timber getting. This resulted in the denuding of the land, the sullying of the water, and dispossession of the local Aboriginal people, the Turrbal peoples. Victoria Park initially spanned an area of 130 hectares, however colonial development of the adjacent suburbs of Herston, Bowen Hills and Spring Hill grew into the park over the following years. Housing developments, schools, hospitals, golf courses and show grounds were permitted to be built on the park land.

During the early colonial period, British settlers named the site "York's Hollow" referencing the colonial name given to the local Turrbal Elder, "Duke of York". During the 1840s up to 400 Aboriginal people of the Turrbal group would reside around the waterholes at York's Hollow. 

In 1846, police lead by Constable Peter Murphy dispersed a major Aboriginal campsite, killing at least 3 people and burning camps. 

In 1849, a detachment of the British Army's 11th Regiment conducted another burning, also wounding several Aboriginal people. 

By the 1860s, most Aboriginal people were either removed from or had left the site.

During the mid 1800s, Brisbane was faced with an influx of immigrants due to the New South Wales Government's immigration schemes. As a result, areas of York's Hollow (the name prior to Victoria Park) provided a settling point for various immigrant camps. York's Hollow was also utilised as a site for brick manufacturing. The arrival of John Dunmore Lang's pioneering emigrant ship  in Brisbane in early 1849 is recognised as one of the landmark events of Queensland's history, and York's Hollow on the edge of the new township was put to good use for their accommodation. According to the Moreton Bay Courier, 253 immigrants were permitted "to form a temporary village on some of the slopes running parallel to the chains and waterholes in the neighbourhood of York's Hollow". During this time 'York's Hollow' included the area to the east of the park that is now the Brisbane Showgrounds in Bowen Hills. Many recent immigrants to Queensland in the mid-1800s stayed in these temporary camps. As Herston and the surrounding area became a popular urban development, these camps were deemed unhealthy and its residents "moved along". Several beautification projects of Victoria Park were undertaken during the late nineteenth century. This included planting avenues of trees.

When Queensland separated from New South Wales in 1859, the Queensland Government made a concerted effort to provide recreational lands for the people of Brisbane, then and for the future. It was believed that the fledgling society would benefit from having open spaces included in the infrastructure. At a time when industry was choking many of the large cities in Britain and Europe, the Queensland Government did not want the same fate to befall Brisbane. Terms such as "lungs of the city" and "breathing space" were used to describe established parks in Brisbane. A Board of Trustees was created at this time to manage Victoria Park; they "expeditiously drew up a code of by-laws which provided, not only for the protection and good government of the park, but also laid down the rules for raising revenue for the improvement of the park". This revenue raising included leasing arrangements for the park.

Late 1800s
Victoria Park borders Spring Hill on the Gregory Terrace side at the south end of the park. This area is one of the oldest suburbs in Brisbane, and Victoria Park was seen as part of this suburb. Spring Hill was home to a cross section of Brisbane society, from the very poorest living in small cottages in the lower slopes of the hill, to the prestigious and wealthy homes overlooking Victoria Park on Gregory Terrace. By the end of the nineteenth century Spring Hill was the most populated suburb in Brisbane. Victoria Park provided an open space for residents of Spring Hill, some of whom lived in crowded and poor conditions at the bottom of the hill. In the period 1870 to 1900, Victoria Park was the largest open reserve within the immediate city area.

In 1877 the Queensland Rifle Association constructed a rifle range in the north-east corner of Victoria Park. This was used both recreationally and for military and police training purposes; the range was used until 1883, when it was closed. The military, however, maintained a presence in Victoria Park, even though it was designated a "public park for recreation, convenience, health and amusement of the inhabitants of the City of Brisbane".

The importance of an extensive railway system throughout Brisbane and the surrounding areas contributed to Queensland's successful development. Victoria Park played a part in this development with a line from Roma Street railway station to Sandgate being constructed through the park in 1882. The line was routed around the outskirts of the inner-city and through Victoria Park to minimise costs. This divided the park into two sections. After the railway was run through the middle of the park (1882), the park was further reduced with the building of The Hospital for Sick Children in 1883. The children's hospital was built on the Herston side of the park as the hill rose to the north. The park's land was reduced over time by the provision of sporting facilities at the south west of the park for Brisbane Grammar School, Brisbane Girls' Grammar School and St Joseph's College, Gregory Terrace. At the start of the 1900s a site in the north-west of the park was considered for a new Government House; however Fernberg in Rosalie was leased for that purpose and later purchased in 1910.

1900s

Early 1900s 
In 1913, Victoria Park played host to a globally significant scientific experiment carried out by the Department of Terrestrial Magnetism of the Carnegie Institution of Washington. The purpose of the experiment was to study the earth's magnetism, and the magnetic variation from "true" north and "magnetic" north so as to eventually gain accurate bearings. The Institute placed small stations in various locations over the earth. The Victoria Park station (a small tent) was placed on the slope below the former Children's Hospital and on the northern side of the existing busway corridor. A sandstone block denoting the exact place where the station was placed was recovered in an archaeological dig carried out in 2001. It was inscribed C.I.W. 1913.

The Brisbane City Council (BCC) Substation No. 4 to the Bowen Bridge end of Victoria Park was designed in 1928 during a period of expansion in Brisbane. The building was designed by City Architect, Alfred Herbert Foster, and may be the earliest surviving unaltered substation designed by him. BCC substations were supplied with bulk energy from BCC power stations and converted it for use by consumers. The introduction of electricity to Brisbane was a slow and complex process. The first public supply of electricity was from the Barton and White generator in Edison Lane to the General Post Office in 1888. The situation was confused by the fact that within the Brisbane metropolitan area there were fourteen separate local authorities and numerous suppliers. Between 1904 and 1925 a number of rationalisations helped reduce this complexity and with the establishment in 1925 of the Brisbane City Council a single public authority was created which could plan for the provision of electrical services throughout the entire city. From 1925 there was a rapid expansion in the provision of infrastructure by the BCC for the delivery of electricity throughout Brisbane.

The park was again reduced by the construction of Victoria Park Golf Club. In the 1920s, municipal golf courses were being established throughout Australia and in 1922 the Queensland Golf Association proposed to the Lord Mayor of Brisbane, William Alfred Jolly, that a municipal golf course be established in Victoria Park. In 1926 the proposal was accepted. The opportunity came after the section of Victoria Park, reserved as the intended site for the University of Queensland, was no longer required after the university acquired their St Lucia site from a generous donation of £63,000 to resume over 200 acres (81 ha) by James and Emelia Mayne. The eighteen hole golf course was laid out by the surveyor Stan Francis, who was an ardent golfer. It was constructed during the Depression by men employed in the Intermittent Relief Scheme . The Victoria Park Golf Course was opened in 1931. The first Victoria Park Golf Clubhouse was designed in the Spanish Mission style by Alfred Herbert Foster and was built in 1931; it is now listed on the Queensland Heritage Register.

Other work was undertaken during the Depression for unemployed persons including landscaping and reclamation, notably Gilchrist Avenue constructed in 1931. The Avenue caused some adjustment of the site of the golf course. It was lined with Silky Oak and Poinciana trees as part of the beautification of the park at this time. Drainage in the lower part of the park was improved to control flooding and an existing lake developed as an ornamental feature of the park. In 1936, the entrance at the corner of Bowen Bridge Road and Gregory Terrace was improved with stone piers constructed of Brisbane Tuff.

World War II and afterwards 
During the Second World War, a number of fibrolite military buildings were constructed at various points in Victoria Park by the forces of the United States of America. Following the outbreak of war in the Pacific in late 1941, Brisbane was transformed into a locale of intense military activity with thousands of American troops stationed there before being shipped off to fight the Japanese forces in the Pacific. While most of the accommodation was canvas tents, a number of huts of fibrolite on timber stumps were constructed south of Herston Road and Gregory Terrace. After the war until 1947 many of these huts were used to house Australian war brides (Australian women who had married American servicemen). After these women married an American they became stateless, losing their Australian citizenship but unable to acquire U. S. citizenship or legal rights as several years of residence in the U.S.A was required. This left many women in a very difficult position.

The post-war reconstruction process heralded an era of rapid population growth in Queensland, leading to an acute shortage in housing. Temporary housing became a necessity. The Queensland State Housing Commission made use of the military facilities in Victoria Park; it became the second largest temporary housing settlement in Brisbane. Each hut would house several families. By 1950 Victoria Park was the impermanent home for 460 families (usually for not more than three years). It is believed that up to 100,000 Queenslanders lived in temporary housing between 1946 and 1960; this demonstrates the importance of this period in Victoria Park's history, as well as to Queensland's social history. The temporary housing camps in Victoria Park were closed in 1960. The University of Queensland purchased several of the fibrolite military buildings immediately after the war. These were then used by the School of Medicine to house the anatomy and physiotherapy departments prior to their permanent move to St. Lucia in 1961 and 1972. The Queensland Institute of Medical Research also purchased a military building. These buildings were all vacated by 1977, and subsequently demolished.

In the 1950s, an extensive flowering tree planting program was initiated for the slopes and gullies of the golf course; poincianas, oleanders, jacarandas and flame trees were planted to line the fair ways. Harry Oakman, the Superintendent of Parks and Gardens was the prominent landscape architect on this project.

Harry Oakman was one of the pioneers of landscape architecture in Australia. In 1945 he began a seventeen-year appointment with the Brisbane City Council as Superintendent of Parks and Gardens and became the Director of Separate Parks Branch. He was in charge of transforming many of Brisbane's parks that had been damaged by the military use during the Second World War, including Victoria Park. Oakman was recognised as a Fellow of the British and Australian Institutes of Landscale Architects and the Royal Australian Institute of Parks and Recreation.

The Centenary of Queensland 
In 1959, Queensland celebrated its Centenary (100 years since Queensland was declared a separate colony (State) from New South Wales with its own local government). Victoria Park played a large role in these celebrations in Brisbane. The Centenary Pool Complex was constructed in this year by the Brisbane City Council as its principal contribution. The pool was placed at the south-west corner of Victoria Park bordering Gregory Terrrace. The complex was designed to fit into the slope of the hill over looking Victoria Park and was designed by Brisbane City Architect James Birrell. The initial design of the complex included a landscaped entrance road designed by Oakman.

Another commemorative gesture was made within Victoria Park with the planting of 1000 eucalypt trees in the south east of the park. Named "The Gundoo Memorial Grove", this large area of planting was accomplished by the students of The Brisbane Girls' Grammar School as their contribution to the celebrations. The trees were provided by the Forestry Department and were nine varieties of eucalypt trees. This area of Victoria Park was in need of beautification as it had previously been the site of some of the Housing Commission buildings, recently demolished. In a memorandum from Harry Oakman he stated "that tree planting along forest lines in this parkland would give a unique feature to the city of Brisbane, particularly if the trees chosen are Eucalypts". He believed that the grove of eucalypts would have advantages such as low cost and little maintenance whilst still being attractive and shade giving.

Middle and late 1900s 
In 1968, the Department of Electricity acquired land in the south east of the park and built an office building behind the Substation. They also purchased a large stores building previously used by the Queensland Railway Department in the same corner of the park.

In 1988, the lake area in Victoria Park was officially named 'York's Hollow'.

2000 and onwards
The Inner City Bypass was completed in 2003. It provides a direct link from Kingsford-Smith Drive at Hamilton through to Hale Street in Paddington and from there onto the South East Freeway. The bypass sits parallel to the railway that runs through Victoria Park. It is another example of the encroachment of Victoria Park's land. The bypass was undertaken to reduce traffic congestion in the Brisbane central business district and Fortitude Valley.

Redevelopment plans 
In December 2020, Council released Victoria Park Vision for the parklands. Community engagement for the Victoria Park Vision included over 2,000 submissions, and identified a number of key themes including environmental restoration, Aboriginal engagement and co-design, delivering small-scale experiences, diverse types of parkland spaces, safety and accessibility, access to transport options, and collaboration with local residents. As part of this process, the Brisbane City Council confirmed that a new visitor and Aboriginal cultural learning centre.

In 2022, Council held community consultation on the Victoria Park / Barrambin Draft Master Plan, a comprehensive proposal to redevelop Victoria Park into a community parkland following the Victoria Park Vision. The Draft Master Plan includes community feedback from over 51,000 submissions, and includes the development of new infrastructure as well as the site of a new BMX track for the Brisbane 2032 Summer Olympics.

Description 
Victoria Park occupies undulating land which generally falls steeply from the ridge at Gregory Terrace down to the railway line, across the railway line, north to Gilchrist Avenue. The ridge offers expansive views across to the Old Museum, RNA Showgrounds (Brisbane Exhibition Ground), Royal Brisbane Hospital, University of Queensland Mayne Medical School, Victoria Park Golf Course, Red Hill, Mt Coot-tha and across to the Brisbane CBD and beyond.

A pair of Brisbane Tuff entrance gate piers stand to Bowen Bridge Road. The tall stepped and tapered Brisbane Tuff piers have dressed stone bases and dado panels with quarry-faced stone corners. Decorative metal lamp holders crown the piers.

The Park has large open grassed areas and is planted with mature figs, eucalypts, shade trees, ornamental trees, palms and planted beds. The Gundoo Memorial Grove of eucalypts stands to the south east end of the park.

A freestanding, single-storey red face and rendered brick pavilion, former BCC Substation No. 4 stands to the corner of Gregory Terrace and Bowen Bridge Road opposite the Old Museum. The Substation addresses the corner at an angle to Bowen Bridge Road complementing that of the more prominent Old Museum to the northeast across Bowen Bridge Road.

The Substation building is rectangular in plan with a timber-framed tiled hip roof behind a rendered brick parapet with a moulded cornice. The elevations are characterised by arch openings, accented keystones and rendered lintels. The front elevation is symmetrical about a projecting central entrance porch in which a decorative crest bearing the lettering BCC sits within an arched doorway. The front elevation end bays are capped by gable fronts to the parapet. The side elevations have parapets with a central gable front. A number of small metal plaques are embedded in the lower part of the front elevation, to the riser of the front concrete stair and to the front stone fence.

A random course quarry-face ashlar wall of Brisbane Tuff runs to the front of the Substation from the Gregory Terrace corner and around into Bowen Bridge Road terminating in a tall capped pier. A small flight of stone stairs flanked by low piers within the wall defines an entrance from Bowen Bridge Road.

The railway and inner-city bypass run directly through the park from the south west to the north east and divide the two sections of the park. The northern section of the park contains several sheltered barbeque and picnic areas amid large expanses of lawn and playing fields. Gilchrist Avenue has been made a cul-de-sac. A wooden and steel footbridge has been constructed over the lake from the end of Gilchrist Avenue over the lakes. The lake contains water-lilies and high grasses. At the east end of the lake is a bronze statue.

Heritage listing 
Victoria Park was listed on the Queensland Heritage Register on 3 December 2007 having satisfied the following criteria:

The place is important in demonstrating the evolution or pattern of Queensland's history.Victoria Park is representative of important phases of Queensland's history. It was the site of an immigration camp in the mid nineteenth century. It was important during the Depression years as the setting for many government work relief schemes. It was the site of accommodation for war brides after the Second World War and also provided temporary accommodation for returned servicemen and their families.Victoria Park was the site of an important, scientific experiment in 1913. The Terrestrial Magnetism experiment was carried out worldwide by the prestigious Department of Terrestrial Magnetism of the Carnegie Institution of Washington to measure the earth's magnetism.
The place demonstrates rare, uncommon or endangered aspects of Queensland's cultural heritage.Victoria Park contains Brisbane City Council Substation No. 4, possibly the earliest surviving unaltered substation designed by architect A.H. Foster in 1928. This Substation demonstrates the way in which architectural contributions to urban design in this period were building sturdy, practical and attractive structures on a domestic scale. It is representative of the period when electricity was introduced to Brisbane and is a good example of its type.
The place is important in demonstrating the principal characteristics of a particular class of cultural places.The park is an example of the works of Harry Oakman, Director of Parks for the Brisbane City Council (1948-1963) who was the first purpose-trained landscape architect to be employed by a government in Queensland.
The place is important because of its aesthetic significance.Victoria Park is significant for its aesthetic values. It is an area of landscaped parkland falling from a ridge offering expansive views in all directions. The park has large open grassed areas and is planted with mature figs, shade trees, palms and garden beds. The Gundoo Memorial Grove of eucalypts stands to the south-east end of the park.
The place has a strong or special association with a particular community or cultural group for social, cultural or spiritual reasons.The park is a popular recreational reserve for organised sport and informal recreation. It contains many sporting facilities such as cricket pitches, tennis courts, golf course, bikeway and swimming pool.

References

Attribution

Further reading

External links

 Victoria Park / Barrambin on the Brisbane City Council website
 Victoria Park / Barrambin Draft Master Plan
 Victoria Park commercial website

Queensland Heritage Register
Spring Hill, Queensland
Parks in Brisbane
Articles incorporating text from the Queensland Heritage Register
Herston, Queensland
Pre-Separation Queensland
Venues of the 2032 Summer Olympics and Paralympics